Ruth is an unincorporated community in Pulaski County, in the U.S. state of Kentucky.

History
The community was named for Ruth, the daughter of a town merchant.

References

Unincorporated communities in Pulaski County, Kentucky
Unincorporated communities in Kentucky